Existence is the fourth full-length album by Beto Vázquez Infinity, released on November 2010.

Track listing

One

Two

Credits

Beto Vazquez Infinity
 Beto Vázquez: Bass - Lyrics - Lead, Rhythm and Acoustic Guitars - Keyboards - Arrangements.
 Jessica Lehto: Lead and Backing Vocals
 Victor Rivarola: Lead and backing Vocals
 Carlos Ferrari: Lead, Rhythm and Acoustic Guitars
 Lucas Pereyra: Lead and Rhythm Guitars - Programming - Orchestral Arrangements.
 Norberto Roman: Drums and Percussion.

Guests
Alfred Romero (Dark Moor)
Christian Bertoncelli (Imperio)
Darío Schmunk
Dominique Leurquin (Rhapsody of Fire, Luca Turilli's Dreamquest)
Chiara "Dusk" Malvestiti (Crysalys)
Enrik Garcia (Dark Moor)
Gaby Koss (formerly Haggard)
Jacob Hansen (Anubis Gate)
Lady Angellyca (Forever Slave)
Melissa Ferlaak (Echoterra)
Mikki Straatsma (Viveynne)
Mik (So Cold)
Sascha Froma
Simone Christinat (Legenda Aurea)
Slava Popova (Operatika)
Sonya Scarlet (Theatres Des Vampires)
Timo Tolkki
Pablo G. Soler
Patricio Molini (Nordica)

External links

References

2010 albums
Beto Vázquez Infinity albums